Sunni Muslims hold Ali in high respect as one of the Ahl al-Bayt, a foremost authority on the Qur'an and Islamic law, and as one of the four Rightly Guided Caliphs. Sunnis consider Ali the fourth and final of the caliphs, unlike Shia Muslims who regard Ali as the first Imam after Muhammad due to their interpretation of the events at Ghadir Khumm.

Sunnis maintain that Ali was among the first males to convert to Islam, when he was 8 years old and he was among the closest companions to the Islamic prophet, Muhammad at the time and to Abu Bakr, Muhammad's closest companion. He is also revered in many hadiths of Muhammad such as the famous hadith: "I am a city of knowledge and Ali is its door" found in the hadith book of Tirmidhi.

Sunnis view Ali as one of the greatest warrior champions of Islam. Examples include taking on the Quraish champion at the Battle of the Trench when nobody else dared. After multiple failed attempts of breaking the fort in the Battle of Khaybar, Ali was summoned, miraculously healed and conquered the fort.

According to Sunni views, after the assassination of the third caliph, Uthman ibn Affan, the companions of Medina chose Ali to be the new caliph. He faced civil war during his reign and while he was praying in the mosque of Kufa, Abd al-Rahman ibn Muljam, one the Kharijites, struck him with a poisoned sword. Ali died on the twenty-first of Ramadan (January 29, 661 AD) in the city of Kufa.

Speeches, lectures, and quotes attributed to Ali have been compiled in the form of several books. Nahj al-Balagha is one of the most popular compilations. Historians and scholars consider it an important work in Islamic literature.

Muhammad's succession
Shortly after the death of Muhammad, there were disputes over who would succeed him, but the Ansar gathered in the shed of Banu Sa’idah and nominated Sa'd bin Ubadah to be the caliph of the Muslims. When Abu Bakr and Umar heard of this, they went to the shed and confirmed the entitlement of the immigrants to the caliphate, according to Sunni sources, and an argument ensued between them. In the end, Abu Bakr was chosen to be the successor of the Prophet.

Some of Muhammad's companions disputed the choice of Abu Bakr, who believed that Muhammad himself had appointed Ali as his successor.

Later, when Fatima and Ali sought help from the Companions in his right to the caliphate, they answered: "O daughter of the Messenger of God! We have pledged allegiance to Abu Bakr. If Ali comes to us before then, we will certainly not abandon him." Ali said: "Is it appropriate for us to dispute the caliphate even before the Prophet was buried?"

After his election to the caliphate, Abu Bakr and Umar along with a few of his companions went to Fatima's house to force Ali and his supporters who had gathered there to sell their loyalty to Abu Bakr. Then Ali claims that Umar threatened to set fire to the house unless they came out and pledged allegiance to Abu Bakr.

Follower of Shia regards the caliphate was known through numerous hadiths, particularly the hadith of Ghadir Khumm. However, Sunnis opined the Ghadir Khumm event is not associated with Ali's succession.

See also
Shia view of Ali

References

Notes

Secondary sources

Bibliography 
 

Sunni belief and doctrine
Ali